Bireswar Vivekananda is a 1964 Indian Bengali-language biographical film about the Indian Hindu religious leader, Swami Vivekananda. The film was directed by Madhu Bose. The film was made under the banner of Sebak Chitra Pratisthan. Anil Bagchi was music composer of this film. Amaresh Das played the main character Swami Vivekananda and Gurudas Bandyopadhyay played the character Ramakrishna.

Cast 
 Amaresh Das as Swami Vivekananda
 Gurudas Bandyopadhyay as Ramakrishna
 Molina Debi
 Mihir Bhattacharya
 Bipin Gupta
 Jahar Ganguly
 Gangapada Basu
 Jiben Bose
 Premangshu Bose
 Priti Majumdar
 Swapan Kumar

See also 
 Swami Vivekananda (1955 film), film directed by Amar Mullick

References

External links 
 

1964 films
Films about Swami Vivekananda
Indian biographical films
Bengali-language Indian films
Bengali-language biographical films
1960s biographical films
1960s Bengali-language films